Lady Isabella may refer to:

People
 Lady Isabella Hervey (b. 1982), British socialite and actress
 Isabel Neville, Duchess of Clarence (1451–1476)
 Isabella of Gloucester and Hertford (1226–1264)
 Isabella FitzRoy, Duchess of Grafton (1668–1723)
 Isabella of Ibelin, Queen of Cyprus (1252–1282), Crusader noble in the city of Beirut

Other uses
 Lady Isabel, 19th-century English child ballad
 Laxey Wheel, nicknamed Lady Isabella, a large waterwheel on the Isle of Man
 Lady Isabella, Sheriff of Nottingham, fictional character in the 2006 TV series Robin Hood